Dekachang is a village in Kamrup rural district, in the state of Assam, India, situated in north bank of river Brahmaputra.

Transport
The village is located north of National Highway 27 and connected to nearby towns and cities like Rangiya and Guwahati with regular buses and other modes of transportation.

See also
 Dhupguri
 Bongra

References

Villages in Kamrup district